Agnieszka Nagay (née Staroń, born 20 February 1981 in Łódź) is a Polish rifle shooter and soldier. She competed in the 50 m rifle three positions event at the 2012 Summer Olympics, where she placed 8th in the final.  She won a bronze medal at the 2005 European Championships, and has finished 2nd (Changwon 2011) and 3rd (Munich 2008) at World Cup Events.

Olympic results

References

External links
 
 
 
 

1981 births
Living people
Polish female sport shooters
Olympic shooters of Poland
Shooters at the 2004 Summer Olympics
Shooters at the 2008 Summer Olympics
Shooters at the 2012 Summer Olympics
Shooters at the 2016 Summer Olympics
Sportspeople from Łódź
European Games competitors for Poland
Shooters at the 2015 European Games
Shooters at the 2019 European Games